Celia Paul (born 11 November 1959) is an Indian-born British painter. Paul's mainly known for her impressionistic work, which she developed during her education at the Slade School of Fine Art.

Biography

Celia Paul was born on 11 November 1959 in Thiruvananthapuram (formerly called Trivandrum), South India. 

From 1976 to 1981 she studied at the Slade School of Fine Art in London, where she met Lucian Freud who was a visiting tutor. She had a relationship with Freud between 1978 and 1988 and has a son by him, Frank Paul (born 10 December 1984), who is also an artist. Spouse, Steven Kupfer (married 2011 - 2021).

Paul was represented by Bernard Jacobson Gallery, London from 1984 to 1986 and then by Marlborough Fine Art, London from 1989 to 2014. She has been represented by Victoria Miro, London since May 2014.

A solo exhibition of new work by the artist titled Celia Paul: Memory and Desire took place at Victoria Miro in London, 6 April–14 May 2022. The exhibition coincided with the publication of Letters to Gwen John, a new book by the artist published by Jonathan Cape and New York Review Books which centres on a series of letters addressed to the painter Gwen John (1876–1939), who has long been a tutelary spirit for Paul.

Paul wrote her autobiography Self-Portrait which was released in 2019 and well-received by national newspapers including The Guardian, The New York Times, and The New York Review of Books.

Style and influences

Celia Paul's paintings are intimate depictions of people and places that she knows well. She does no portrait commissions. Her paintings have a haunting otherworldly feeling. "Throughout all her work the sense of sight is associated with a world of potential, within. This is how a sense of the ineffable is able to be communicated". Paul worked on a series of paintings of her mother from 1977 to 2007 and since then she has concentrated on her four sisters, especially her sister Kate. "…[T]he real strength of Paul's project becomes apparent with time: the concentrated emotional energy of chronicling a family and its subtle shifts over many years". Recently her work has taken a new direction and she has been focussing on landscape and the sea. "[S]he …is a creator of subterranean images. Her canvases are Impressionism in conversation with modernism- objective but felt".

Solo exhibitions
"Celia Paul: Memory and Desire", Victoria Miro, London, 6 April – 14 May 2022
"Celia Paul: Self-Portrait", an extended reality (XR) exhibition on Vortic Collect, Victoria Miro, London, UK, 10 November – 12 December 2020
"Celia Paul: My Studio", an extended reality (XR) exhibition on Vortic Collect, Victoria Miro, London, UK, 26 June – 25 July 2020
"Celia Paul", Victoria Miro, London, 13 November – 20 December 2019
"Celia Paul", curated by Hilton Als, Yale Center for British Art, 3 April – 12 August 2018
"The Sea and The Mirror", Victoria Miro Venice, 23 September – 21 December 2017
"Desdemona for Hilton by Celia", Victoria Miro, London, 16 September – 29 October 2016
"Desdemona for Celia by Hilton", Gallery Met, New York, 2015
"Celia Paul", Victoria Miro, 2014
"Gwen John and Celia Paul: Painters in Parallel", Pallant House Gallery, Chichester, 2012–2013
"Celia Paul", Graves Art Gallery, Sheffield, 2005
"Celia Paul: Stillness", Abbot Hall, Kendal, 2004
Regular solo exhibitions at Marlborough Fine Art, 1991–2013
"Celia Paul", Bernard Jacobson Gallery, 1986

Group exhibitions
 "Pictus Porrectus: Reconsidering the Full-Length Portrait", curated by Dodie Kazanjian and Alison Gingeras, Isaac Bell House, Newport, Rhode Island, 1 July – 2 October 2022
 "Me, Myself, I – Artists’ Self-Portraits", Royal West of England Academy, Bristol, 2 May – 19 June 2022
 "Figuration", Marlborough Gallery, London, 17 March – 29 April 2022
 "The Sublime in Nature", Daniel Malarkey, London, 16 June – 10 July 2021
 "I See You", an extended reality (XR) exhibition on Vortic Collect, Victoria Miro, London, 2 June – 4 July 2020
 "Parley for the Oceans x Vortic", online exhibition on Vortic, 2 October – 2 November 2020
 "Works on Paper", Galleri Bo Bjerggaard, Copenhagen, 26 January – 6 April 2019
 "Unparalleled Journey through Contemporary Art of Past 50 Years", Rubell Museum, Miami, USA, on view since 4 December 2019
 "Contemporary Dialogues with Tintoretto", Palazzo Ducale and Galleria Giorgio Franchetti alla Ca’ d’Oro, Venice, 20 October 2018 – 24 February 2019
 "Studio Prints: a Survey", Marlborough Fine Art, London, 30 November – 21 December 2018
 "All Too Human", Tate Britain, 28 February – 26 August 2018; travelling to Museum of Fine Arts, Budapest,  9 October 2018 – 13 January 2019
 "House Work", Victoria Miro Mayfair, London, 1 February – 18 March 2017
 "NO MAN'S LAND: Women Artists from the Rubell Family Collection", Rubell Family Collection, Miami, 2015 – 2016
 "Forces in Nature", curated by Hilton Als; Victoria Miro, London, 2015
 Work presented at Frieze Art Fair, London, 2014 by Victoria Miro
"Cinematic Visions: Painting at the Edge of Reality", curated by James Franco, Isaac Julien and Glenn Scott Wright, Victoria Miro, London, 2013
"Self-Consciousness", curated by Peter Doig and Hilton Als, VeneKlasen/Werner, Berlin, 2010
"Psycho", curated by Danny Moynihan, Anne Faggionato, London, 2000
"School of London", Odette Gilbert, London, 1989
"British Figurative Art: Sickert to Bacon", Israel Museum, Jerusalem, 1989
"School of London: Bacon to Bevan", Musée Maillol, Paris, 1998
"September", curated by Peter Doig, The approach, London, 1997

Films and interviews
Celia Paul: Private View, directed by Jake Auerbach, 2019
In Conversation with Hilton Als, Victoria Miro, London, 8 July 2014
Artists at War: Walter Sickert, directed by Danny Katz, 2014
Woman's Hour, broadcast on BBC Radio 4, 1 October 2012
The Last Art Film, directed by Jake Auerbach, 2010
Lucian Freud, directed by Randall Wright, 2011
Lucian Freud, directed by Jake Auerbach, 2004

Public collections

British Museum, London; National Portrait Gallery, London, Victoria and Albert Museum, London; Saatchi Collection, London; Abbot Hall, Kendal; Metropolitan Museum of Art, New York; Yale Center for British Art, Connecticut; Carlsberg Foundation, Copenhagen; Frissiras Museum, Athens; Herzog Anton Ulrich Museum, Brunswick, Germany; Morgan Library , New York; New Hall Art Collection, Cambridge

Further reading
Celia Paul, Letters to Gwen John. Jonathan Cape, April 2022 
Celia Paul, Self-Portrait. Jonathan Cape, November 2019 
Beth Williamson, Celia Paul: Memory and Desire , Studio International, 29 April 2022
Drusilla Modjeska, Looking to the Past, an Artist Finds a Soul Mate in Gwen John , The New York Times, 26 April 2022
Celia Paul, Against Any Intrusion: Writing to Gwen John , The Paris Review, 2 March 2022
Zadie Smith, The Muse at her Easel, The New York Review of Books, 21 November 2019
Tim Adams, Celia Paul on life after Lucian Freud: ‘I had to make this story my own’, The Guardian, 27 October 2019
Financial Times Magazine: "Acclaimed artist Celia Paul on painting from life- and loss": 16 March 2018
Farah Nayeri, New York Times: Artist’s Muse Steps out of the Shadows: 5 March 2018 and front page of New York Times International 11 March 2018
Sophie Elmhirst, ‘Standing Tall: Celia Paul will always be her own woman’, Harper’s Bazaar Art, November 2016 [Cover artwork Anemone, Celia Paul, May 2016]
Laura Cumming, ‘It’s always the quiet ones...’, The New Review [The Observer], 11 September 2016
Jackie Wullschlager, ‘Artist Celia Paul explores the beauty of melancholy’, Financial Times, 2 September 2016
Hilton Als, "Celia at Home", in Celia Paul (London: Victoria Miro, 2014)
Rowan Williams, (introduction) Gwen John and Celia Paul: Painters in Parallel (Chichester: Pallant House Gallery, 2012)
Catherine Lampert, "Eighty Steps", in Celia Paul (London: Marlborough Fine Art, 2011)
Frank Paul, (introductions) Celia Paul (Sheffield: Graves Art Gallery, 2005) and Celia Paul (London: Marlborough Fine Art, 2013)
William Feaver, (introduction) Celia Paul: Stillness (Kendal: Abbot Hall Art Gallery, 2004)
Alistair Hicks, The School of London: Resurgence of Contemporary Painting (Oxford: Phaidon Press, 1989)
"Can a Woman Who Is an Artist Ever Just Be an Artist", New York Times Magazine, November 2019
The Muse at her Easel; Zadie Smith; 21 November 2019, New York Review of Books

References

External links

Celia Paul at Victoria Miro

1959 births
20th-century British painters
21st-century British painters
Modern painters
Alumni of the Slade School of Fine Art
Living people